Ishme-Dagan I was a monarch of Ekallatum and Assur during the Old Assyrian period. The much later Assyrian King List (AKL) credits Ishme-Dagan I with a reign of forty years; however, it is now known from a limmu-list of eponyms unearthed at Kanesh in 2003 that his reign in Assur lasted eleven years. According to the AKL, Ishme-Dagan I was the son and successor of Shamshi-Adad I. Also according to the AKL, Ishme-Dagan I was succeeded by his son Mut-Ashkur.

Biography

Family 

Ishme-Dagan I's father, Shamshi-Adad I, was an Amorite king, originally of Terqa (in Syria), who seized control of Assyria around 1808 BCE. 

Shamshi-Adad I ruled from Shubat-Enlil. Shamshi-Adad I placed his oldest son (Ishme-Dagan I) on the throne of Ekallatum. Shamshi-Adad I placed his youngest son (Yasmah-Adad) on the throne of Mari. Ishme-Dagan I ruled the south-eastern region in Upper Mesopotamia. Ishme-Dagan I's realm of influence included the city-state of Assur.

Correspondence

A number of letters relating the familial relationships between Shamshi-Adad I and his two sons have been excavated, and these letters provide a glimpse into the tensions of this family of rulers. Ishme-Dagan I is called, “A forceful soldier not afraid to risk his own skin.” This was a quality which allowed Shamshi-Adad I to rely on him unhesitatingly. Shamshi-Adad I's correspondence with his younger son is not as generous, and Ishme-Dagan I appears to have picked up his father's censure of his younger brother and contributed to it. In one letter, Ishme-Dagan I asks his brother, “Why are you setting up a wail about this thing? That is not great conduct.” In another letter, Ishme-Dagan I bluntly commands Yasmah-Adad to, “Show some sense.” In a third, Ishme-Dagan I tells his brother to stop writing their father directly, and use him as an intermediary.

Conquests of Ishme-Dagan I

War against Eshnunna

Ishme-Dagan I's main challenge was in keeping his enemies in check. To Ishme-Dagan I's south was the King Dadusha of Eshnunna (fl. c. 1800 BCE — c. 1779 BCE.) To Ishme-Dagan I's east were the warlike, nomadic, pastoral peoples inhabiting the foothills of the Zagros mountains. Eshnunna was to be Ishme-Dagan I's chief enemy, and although records are sparse, there are some accounts of some political conflicts involving Eshnunna. An instance of defeat occurs in a year-name coined by the King Dadusha of Eshnunna which commemorates a victory over an army led by Ishme-Dagan I.

Campaign against Qabra and Nurugum

Shamshi-Adad I, along with Ishme-Dagan I, embarked on a new campaign against both Qabra and Nurugum. During the course of the campaign on Nurugum, Ishme-Dagan I and his armies besieged the city of Nineveh. Once Ishme-Dagan I conquered Nineveh, he allowed some prisoners to enter his army, and gave special treatment to skilled prisoners (according to letters excavated from the period.) These expeditions betray the different attitudes of the urban peoples toward the tribal peoples. The people of the kingdoms were treated differently than the tribal people.

Campaign against the Ya’ilanum

Another campaign for which records exist is a campaign that Ishme-Dagan I appears to have engaged in was against the nomadic tribe called the Ya’ilanum. Shamshi-Adad I had ordered Yasmah-Adad to execute all the members of this tribe. However, it was the troops of Ishme-Dagan I who later exterminated the entire tribe. There are two accounts of this annihilation, one from Shamshi-Adad I, and one from Ishme-Dagan I. Shamshi-Adad I seems to have slightly reneged on his earlier bloodthirstiness toward the tribes, as his account appears to limit the killing to the leaders and the combatants of the army, but in a letter from Ishme-Dagan I to Yasmah-Adad, it seems the whole population was eradicated, as he states:

Death of Shamshi-Adad I

Although his father counted Ishme-Dagan I as politically astute and a capable soldier, commending him as he berated Yasmah-Adad in their letters, Ishme-Dagan I was not able to hold his father's empire for long after his father died. Ishme-Dagan I eventually lost most of his domain, and was reduced to holding Ashur and Ekallatum, despite waging several counter offensives to try to regain the upper Khabur area. The year-name of the fifth year of Ibalpiel II's reign (indicating some reverence to Shamshi-Adad I at his passing) suggests that Eshnunna had become subservient to the Ekallatum. Ishme-Dagan I wrote a letter to his brother, after Ishme-Dagan I assumes their father's throne and the rule of all of Upper Mesopotamia, that he:

His confidence was overstated, however; as year-names of the eighth and ninth years of King Ibalpiel's reign indicate Eshnunna attacked and destroyed the armies of Ashur and Mari, and Ishme-Dagan I's control over his father's entire realm slipped, as his hold was reduced to the region of Ashur and Ekallatum.

A letter that was purportedly from Ishme-Dagan I, writing to his brother after their father had died, states:

This letter led historians to believe that Yasmah-Adad held the throne of Mari for a while after his father died. However,  this letter was proven to actually be from Ishme-Addu of Ashnakku, (written to Ibal-Addu of Ashlakka), thus disproving many chronologies that had been based on the letter.

In addition to letters whose authorship can be verified to Ishme-Dagan I, Shamshi-Adad I and Yasmah-Adad, there have been letters attributed to this family that were not written by them. One such letter caused issues in the chronology of the ancient near east, as it allowed historians to place dates on Hammurabi of Babylon.

Subservience to Babylon
Some evidence indicates that after his reduction in power, Ishme-Dagan I appeared to hold tolerable relations with Babylon, Eshnunna, and Mari. Hammurabi requested reinforcements from Ishme-Dagan I at least once, and Ishme-Dagan I responded, though it seems his response was grudging, and Hammurabi was not entirely pleased with the poor support. However, Ishme-Dagan's troops were present in Hammurabi's war against Elam, and Hammurabi even allowed Ishme-Dagan's generals into his secret council meetings, to the dismay of Zimri-Lim, Hammurabi's then ally. Ishme-Dagan's reputation with Hammurabi fluctuated with Hammurabi's goals, and there is some evidence that Hammurabi sent troops to aide Atamrum, one of Ishme-Dagan's rivals, during Babylon's war with Larsa. Later, it is likely that Ishme-Dagan I was the king of Ashur when Hammurabi vanquished her king and occupied Assyrian lands.

See also

 Assyrian people
 Assyrian continuity
 List of Assyrian kings
 Timeline of the Assyrian Empire
 Chronology of the ancient Near East

References

Sources

18th-century BC Assyrian kings
Amorite kings
Year of birth unknown

Year of death unknown